This article shows the 2013 season of South Korean football.

National team results

Senior team

Under-23 team

K League

K League Classic

K League Challenge

Promotion-relegation playoffs 

Sangju Sangmu won 4–2 on aggregate and were promoted to the K League Classic, while Gangwon FC were relegated to the K League Challenge.

Korean FA Cup

Final

Korea National League

Championship playoff

WK League

Table

Playoff and championship
The playoff is played one leg and championship final is played over two legs.

Korea National League Championship

Final

AFC Champions League 

South Korean clubs' score displayed first

References

External links

 
Seasons in South Korean football